The 1964 California Golden Bears football team was an American football team that represented the University of California, Berkeley in the Athletic Association of Western Universities (AAWU) during the 1964 NCAA University Division football season. In its first year under head coach Ray Willsey, the team compiled a 3–7 record (0–4 against AAWU opponents), finished in last place in the AAWU, and was outscored by its opponents by a combined total of 187 to 152.

The team's statistical leaders included Craig Morton with 2,121 passing yards, Tom Relles with 519 rushing yards, and Jack Schraub with 633 receiving yards. Morton was later inducted into the College Football Hall of Fame.

Schedule

Roster

References

California
California Golden Bears football seasons
California Golden Bears football